Shibalidian Area is an area and township on the southwest of Chaoyang District, Beijing, China. It borders Fatou and Panjiayuan Subdistricts as well as Nanmofang and Yusiying Townships to the north, Dougezhuang Township and Taihu Town to the east, Yizhuang Township and Beijing Economic-Technological Development Area to the south, Xiaohongmen, Nanyuan and Fangzhuang Townships to the west. As of the year 2020, it has a total population of 178,177.

The subdistrict got its name Shibalidian due to it is located 18 Lis from Zhengyangmen, a city gate on the former Beijing city wall.

History

Administrative Divisions 
As of 2021, there are a total of 16 subdivisions in Shibalidian, 8 of them are communities and 8 are villages:

See also 
 List of township-level divisions of Beijing

References 

Chaoyang District, Beijing
Areas of Beijing